West Tambaram is a locality in Tambaram Tamil Nadu, India, located in the Chennai Metropolitan city. It is one of the main commercial and residential areas of the metropolitan region. Its main features include shopping centres such as Annai retail, More, Domino's, several colleges, schools, banks and public libraries. Shanmugam Road is a main shopping street located opposite to tambaram  railway station which includes wholesale grocery as well as a huge vegetable market. Tambaram Mudichur road The main road through West Tambaram connects the Chennai Neighbourhood of Lakshmi Nagar, Krishna Nagar, Bharathi Nagar, Old Perungalathur, Madhana Puram, Mullai Nagar TNHB colony and Mudichur, ending at the Vandalur - Oragadam road. West Tambaram has been growing rapidly since the development of the Vandaloor-Nemilichery Outer Ring Road.

Supermarkets in West Tambaram include Heritage, Reliance Fresh and Nilgiris are in West Tambaram. Banks include SBI, Canara Bank, Axis Bank, ICICI Bank, Indian Overseas Bank, and Indian Bank. Schools include Valluvar Gurukulam, Shri Anand Jain Vidyalaya Matriculation and Higher Secondary School. Kishkintha Theme Park is located at the intersection of Dharkast Road and the Outer Ring Road. 
 

Neighbourhoods in Chennai